The Sussex County Historical Society is a non-profit organization incorporated in 1904 in the State of New Jersey.  It is located in Newton, in Sussex County, New Jersey, United States, and pursues a mission of promoting public knowledge and interest in the county's heritage.

Hill Memorial Museum
Hill Memorial Museum at 82 Main Street in Newton, was constructed for the historical society in 1916 and has served as its home since then. It was built in the renaissance revival style to the design of Henry T. Stephens, an architect from Paterson, New Jersey by local contractor Thomas Farrel. It was dedicated on June 8, 1917 and named after three relatives of the main donor, Joshua Hill. It is the oldest building continuously operated as a museum in the State of New Jersey.  The Hill Memorial was placed on the New Jersey Register of Historic Places and National Register of Historic Places on 18 July 1985.

The entry hall has a grand staircase made of quartered oak. The exterior walls are constructed in brick in two shades made by the N.H. Sloan kilns of Pennsylvania. Ornaments for the entrance were manufactured by the Brick Terra Cotta & Tile Company of Corning, New York. A 1922 fireplace on the ground floor was made by George Sharp with stones of local geological and historic significance.

The second floor houses collections of quilts and other textiles, farming tools, baskets and other household items, Civil War memorabilia, and a partial skeleton of a Mastodon discovered nearby.

See also
 List of museums in New Jersey

References

External links
 Sussex County Historical Society (website)

Buildings and structures in Sussex County, New Jersey
Museums in Sussex County, New Jersey
Tourist attractions in Sussex County, New Jersey
Historical societies in New Jersey
History of New Jersey
National Register of Historic Places in Sussex County, New Jersey
Newton, New Jersey
Renaissance Revival architecture in New Jersey
Buildings and structures completed in 1916